Invalidity, Old-Age and Survivors' Benefits Convention, 1967 is  an International Labour Organization Convention.

It was established in 1967, with the preamble stating:

Having decided upon the adoption of certain proposals with regard to the revision of the Old-Age Insurance (Industry, etc.) Convention, 1933, the Old-Age Insurance (Agriculture) Convention, 1933, the Invalidity Insurance (Industry, etc.) Convention, 1933, the Invalidity Insurance (Agriculture) Convention, 1933, the Survivors' Insurance (Industry, etc.) Convention, 1933, and the Survivors' Insurance (Agriculture) Convention, 1933,...

Modification 
The convention is a revision of:

Convention C35 – Old-Age Insurance (Industry, etc.) Convention, 1933 (shelved).
Convention C36 – Old-Age Insurance (Agriculture) Convention, 1933 (shelved).
Convention C37 – Invalidity Insurance (Industry, etc.) Convention, 1933 (shelved).
Convention C38 – Invalidity Insurance (Agriculture) Convention, 1933 (shelved).
Convention C40 – Survivors' Insurance (Agriculture) Convention, 1933 (shelved).

Ratifications
As of 2022, the convention has been ratified by 17 states.

References

External links 
Text.
List
Ratifications.

International Labour Organization conventions
Disability law
Retirement
Treaties concluded in 1967
Treaties entered into force in 1969
Treaties of Austria
Treaties of Barbados
Treaties of Belgium
Treaties of Bolivia
Treaties of Cyprus
Treaties of Czechoslovakia
Treaties of the Czech Republic
Treaties of Ecuador
Treaties of Finland
Treaties of West Germany
Treaties of the Libyan Arab Republic
Treaties of the Netherlands
Treaties of Norway
Treaties of Slovakia
Treaties of Sweden
Treaties of Switzerland
Treaties of Uruguay
Treaties of Venezuela
1967 in labor relations